Boškovići may refer to:

Boškovići (Goražde)
Boškovići (Laktaši)
Boškovići (Zvornik)

See also
Bošković, surname